Amides of lysergic acid are collectively known as lysergamides, and include a number of compounds with potent agonist and/or antagonist activity at various serotonin and dopamine receptors.

See also 
 Ergoline
 Bromocriptine
 Fumigaclavine C
 Hydergine
 Lisuride
 Pergolide

References